Milton Doyle (born October 31, 1993) is an American professional basketball player for Tofaş of Basketbol Süper Ligi (BSL). He played college basketball for the Loyola Ramblers.

College career
A graduate of Chicago's Marshall High School, Doyle transferred to Loyola (Illinois) from the University of Kansas. He became the first player in the Loyola Ramblers' history to be named to the All-MVC First Team and was also named as NABC First Team All-District 16 during his senior year.

Doyle was named MVC basketball player of the week twice during the 2016–17 season.

Professional career

Long Island Nets (2017) 
Doyle went undrafted for the 2017 NBA Draft. On June 23, 2017, Doyle was invited to join the Brooklyn Nets' 2017 NBA Summer League team. He scored 13 points, 4 rebounds and 1 assist in 16 minutes of play in his debut.

On August 4, 2017, Doyle signed with the Nets. On October 11, he was waived by the Nets. He would later be assigned to the Long Island Nets NBA G League affiliate squad after being waived, playing for them in 17 games around that time.

Brooklyn Nets (2017–2018) 
On December 18, the Brooklyn Nets signed Doyle to a two-way contract after waiving their previous candidate Yakuba Ouattara. From this point throughout the rest of the season onward, Doyle would split playing time between the parent squad in Brooklyn and the affiliate squad in Long Island, with a majority of his time spent on Long Island. Doyle would make his NBA debut on December 26, 2017, scoring 2 points in a single minute of action under a 109–97 loss against the San Antonio Spurs.

Murcia (2018–2019) 
On August 8, 2018, Doyle signed a one-year deal with UCAM Murcia of the Liga ACB.

Windy City Bulls (2019–2020) 
On September 30, 2019, Doyle signed a partially guaranteed deal with the Chicago Bulls. He was assigned to their G League affiliate, the Windy City Bulls. During the shortened 2019–20 season, Doyle averaged 17.5 points, 5.8 assists, 4.1 rebounds, and 2 steals per game, shooting 40% from the field and 36% from three point range.

Pallacanestro Trieste (2020–2021) 
In July 2020, Doyle signed with Italian team Pallacanestro Trieste.

Gaziantep Basketbol (2021–2022) 
On August 12, 2021, Doyle signed with Gaziantep Basketbol of the Basketbol Süper Ligi (BSL).

Tasmania JackJumpers (2022–2023) 
On June 24, 2022, Doyle signed with the Tasmania JackJumpers in Australia for the 2022–23 NBL season.

Tofaş (2023–present) 
On February 21, 2023, Doyle signed with Tofaş of Basketbol Süper Ligi (BSL).

NBA career statistics

Regular season 

|-
| style="text-align:left;"| 
| style="text-align:left;"|Brooklyn
| 10 || 0 || 12.5 || .277 || .174 || .500 || 1.8 || 1.0 || .6 || .2 || 3.4
|- class="sortbottom"
| style="text-align:center;" colspan="2"| Career
| 10 || 0 || 12.5 || .277 || .174 || .500 || 1.8 || 1.0 || .6 || .2 || 3.4

References

External links
Loyola Ramblers bio

1993 births
Living people
21st-century African-American sportspeople
African-American basketball players
American expatriate basketball people in Australia
American expatriate basketball people in Italy
American expatriate basketball people in Spain
American expatriate basketball people in Turkey
American men's basketball players
Basketball players from Chicago
Brooklyn Nets players
CB Murcia players
Gaziantep Basketbol players
Lega Basket Serie A players
Liga ACB players
Long Island Nets players
Loyola Ramblers men's basketball players
Pallacanestro Trieste players
Shooting guards
Tasmania JackJumpers players
Tofaş S.K. players
Undrafted National Basketball Association players
Windy City Bulls players